Alessandra Paonessa (born July 24, 1989) is a Canadian soprano from Toronto. Her 2014 debut album Remembering Heaven, a collaboration featuring the works of British composer Chris Broom, reached number 25 in the UK Official Classical Artist Album Charts - Top 50.

Early life
Alessandra  began to take voice lessons at the young age of 10 and performed her first official recital at the age of 15. She later joined the Bach Children's group,  traveling across Canada taking part in festivals, performing regularly at the Toronto Theatre for the Arts and even performed for her Majesty, Queen Elizabeth II, on her royal tour to Canada in 2004. A former member of the Young Artist Performance Academy and Royal Conservatory of Music, she was the winner of many performance festivals and awards in her youth. Paonessa is an alumnus of OperaWorks Emerging Artist Program and graduate of York University, where she received the Sterling Beckwith Award, a scholarship given to students who demonstrate exceptional promise and ability in performance.

Career
In 2012 Alessandra  made her European debut as both 'Eumete' and 'Guinone' in Academia Europea Dell'Opera's production of 'Il Ritorno d'Ulisse in Patria' (Monteverdi) under the baton of Gary Thor Wedow (conductor). Other roles include 'First Witch' ('Dido and Aeneas') with York University,  Fiordiligi ('Così fan tutte') with Toronto Summer Opera Workshop and First Boy in Oshawa Opera's production of 'The Magic Flute' directed by Kristine Dandavino.

In 2014 Alessandra was contacted by British composer, Chris Broom who invited her to sing his original composition, Dolce Vento. This later resulted in a long term partnership and the release of her debut album 'Remembering Heaven' which they produced together that same year.
The album features eight original works composed by Chris Broom as well as a selection of well known classical songs. The album was released in November 2014 by Dell'Alto Records, and later won several awards including Global Music Awards 'Best Album' and Hollywood Music in Media's 'Best Female Vocal Performance'.

In 2015 Alessandra made her UK debut at the historic Tremfan Hall, Llanbedrog, Wales, in the Oceans Unite concert with teenage singers British soprano Scarlett Quigley and tenor Charlie Botting in support of the Royal National Lifeboat Institution. and returned in the spring of 2016, to support Britain's X-Factor Stars, G4 on their Back For Good Tour across England.

Discography
November 2014: Remembering Heaven 

Track List:
 Dolce Vento
 Ai Giochi Addio
 Amore E Speranza
 Parla Piu Piano
 Dark Waltz
 Saro Tua Amor
 Sempre
 Inverno
 Now I've Found You At Last
 Perfect Summer Days
 Follow Your Dream
 Nella Fantasia

Awards and nominations
2015: Gold Medal for Remembering Heaven - Best Album and Vocalist in the Global Music Awards.
2015: Best Female Vocalist for "Dolce Vento" - Hollywood Music in Media Awards.
2015: Best Classical or Instrumental - Toronto Independent Music Awards.
2015: Best Female Classical Artist for "Ai Giochi Addio" - The Radio Music Awards.
2015: Vocal Performance Finalist for "Dolce Vento" - Unsigned Only Music Competition.

Philanthropy
Alessandra is an ambassador for "Hope for Hearts", a project in support of Sick Kids Hospital Foundation; an organization that inspires communities to invest in health and scientific research to improve the life of children and families in Canada and abroad.

References

External links

1989 births
Living people
Musicians from Toronto
Canadian sopranos
21st-century Canadian women singers